Trilisa is a genus of flowering plants in the tribe Eupatorieae within the family Asteraceae.

Some taxonomists group Trilisa and Litrisa into the genus Carphephorus.

 Species
 Trilisa odoratissima (J.F.Gmel.) Cass. - Louisiana, Mississippi, Alabama, Georgia, Florida, North and South Carolina
 Trilisa paniculata (J.F.Gmel.) Cass. - Alabama, Georgia, Florida, North and South Carolina

References

Flora of the Southeastern United States
Asteraceae genera
Eupatorieae